Iglesia de San Andrés (Valdebárzana) is a 12th-century, Romanesque-style, Roman Catholic church, located in Valdebárzana in the autonomous community of Asturias, Spain. It was established in 1189.

Gallery

See also
Asturian art
Catholic Church in Spain

References

Churches in Asturias
1189 establishments in Europe
Romanesque architecture in Asturias
12th-century establishments in the Kingdom of León
12th-century Roman Catholic church buildings in Spain
Bien de Interés Cultural landmarks in Asturias